Passion is a 1998 Hungarian drama film directed by György Fehér. It was screened in the Un Certain Regard section at the 1998 Cannes Film Festival. It is based on the 1934 novel The Postman Always Rings Twice by James M. Cain. It was awarded six prizes at the 1998 Hungarian Film Week, including best film, best direction, best cinematography, best actress (Ildikó Bánsági), best actor(s) (Djoko Rosic and János Derzsi), and the Foreign Film Critics' Gene Moskowitz prize.

Cast
 Ildikó Bánsági as The wife
 Djoko Rosic as The husband
 János Derzsi as The man
 István Lénárt as The attorney
 László Gálffi as The priest
 Zoltán Bezerédi as The doctor's scribe (as Bezerédi Zoltán)
 Géza Bereményi as The doctor
 Dénes Ujlaky
 Péter Haumann as The lawyer
 Gergõ Borhi
 Imre Csuja
 Gábor Székely
 Tibor Viczkó

References

External links
 
 

1998 films
1998 drama films
Adultery in films
1990s Hungarian-language films
Films based on works by James M. Cain
Films directed by György Fehér
Hungarian black-and-white films